The Sunflower River Blues & Gospel Festival is an annual music festival in Clarksdale, Mississippi. It is held the second weekend in August, lasting three days. Created as the Sunflower Riverbank Blues Festival in 1988, the festival features veteran and homegrown performers, attracting blues enthusiast from all over the world. Headliners have included Otis Rush, Ike Turner, Little Milton, Bobby Bland, Bobby Rush, Koko Taylor, Denise LaSalle, Super Chikan, and Robert Plant.

History 
The Sunflower Riverbank Blues Festival was funded by The Downtown Association of Clarksdale partnered with the Mississippi Delta Arts Council, WROX radio, Delta Blues Museum, Rooster Blues Records, City of Clarksdale, Cahoma County Chamber of Commerce, and Sunflower River Yacht Club. The event was and organized by Living Blues co-founder Jim O'Neal and Dr. Patricia Johnson in 1988. It took place on the banks of the Sunflower River and was filmed by Mississippi Educational Television (ETV). Since then, the festival has been organized by the Sunflower River Blues Association, funded by the Mississippi Arts Commission and the National Endowment for the Arts.

In 1991, the Early Wright Blues Heritage Award was established to honor Early Wright, "The Soul Man" of WROX radio who was Mississippi's first black radio disc jockey.

In 1992, promoters Melville Tillis and Julius Guy held the Issaquena Gospel Festival. In 1993, the two festivals were merged into the Sunflower River Blues & Gospel festival. Tillis became co-chairman of the association. Guy died in 1993, and in 1994, the Julius Guy Gospel Heritage Award was created in his honor.

For the first time in 2012, the festival sold V.I.P tickets, for headliners Robert Plant and the Sensational Space Shifters, generating funds for subsequent festivals. Also in 2012, the Sunflower River Blues & Gospel Festival was recognized with a marker on the Mississippi Blues Trail.

Headliners

References

External links
 Official website
 Sunflower River Blues on Mississippi Blues Trail
 Sunflower Chronology on Delta Blues Museum

Music festivals established in 1988
Music festivals in Mississippi
Tourist attractions in Coahoma County, Mississippi
Blues festivals in the United States
Gospel music festivals
Mississippi Blues Trail